Victory Christian Academy is a private, Christian elementary and high school in Chula Vista, California. It is affiliated with the Lutheran Church–Missouri Synod. The school serves approximately 180 students in total (K-12).

Lutheran High School opened as Cal Lutheran High School in 1975 with its first graduating class in 1978. In 1984, its name was changed to Lutheran High School of San Diego and it moved to a new campus in the Lake of Murray area of San Diego. The campus was located on the old Cleveland Elementary public school on Lake Atlin. The school stayed there until spring 1988. In fall 1988, it moved back to Faith Lutheran Church. In fall 1999, the school moved to Holy Spirit Catholic Church located on 55th street in San Diego. In fall 2009, it was granted a permanent home located at the Church of Joy Lutheran Church in Chula Vista on Buena Vista Way. In 2015 the high school and the Church of Joy merged with Pilgrim Lutheran Church and its elementary school to form Victory Christian Church and Academy.

Notable alumni
James Burkee, politician and academic

References

External links

Christian schools in California
High schools in San Diego County, California
Lutheran schools in California
Private high schools in California
Education in Chula Vista, California
Secondary schools affiliated with the Lutheran Church–Missouri Synod
1975 establishments in California